is a Japanese light novel series written by Sai Sumimori. Originally published via the novel posting website Shōsetsuka ni Narō in September 2018, the series was later acquired by Kodansha, who began publishing the series in print with illustrations by Ai Takahashi. As of October 2021, five volumes have been released. A manga adaptation, also illustrated by Takahashi, began serialization on the Niconico-based web manga platform Suiyōbi no Sirius in April 2019. As of February 2023, the series' individual chapters have been collected into eight volumes. An anime television series adaptation is set to premiere in 2023.

Media

Light novel
Written by Sai Sumimori, the series began publication on the novel posting website Shōsetsuka ni Narō on September 1, 2018. The series was later acquired by Kodansha, who began publishing the series in print with illustrations by Ai Takahashi on May 31, 2019. As of October 2021, five volumes have been released.

In March 2022, Kodansha USA announced that they licensed the series for English publication.

Volume list

Manga
A manga adaptation, illustrated by Takahashi, began serialization on the Niconico-based Suiyōbi no Sirius manga platform on April 3, 2019. In April 2022, the series went on hiatus; Takahashi cited "personal circumstances" as the reason for the hiatus. As of February 2023, the manga's individual chapters have been collected into eight tankōbon volumes.

In October 2020, Kodansha USA announced that they licensed the manga adaptation for digital English publication. During their panel at Anime Expo 2022, Kodnasha USA announced that they would publish the manga in print in Q2 2023.

Volume list

Anime
On September 7, 2022, an anime television series adaptation was announced. It is set to premiere in 2023.

References

External links
  
  
 

2019 Japanese novels
2023 anime television series debuts
Anime and manga based on light novels
Fiction about reincarnation
Isekai anime and manga
Isekai novels and light novels
Japanese webcomics
Kodansha books
Kodansha manga
Light novels
Light novels first published online
Shōnen manga
Shōsetsuka ni Narō
Upcoming anime television series
Webcomics in print